Posen is a village in Presque Isle County of the U.S. state of Michigan.  The population was 234 at the 2010 census. The village is in Posen Township.

Posen has a strong Polish background as 78.8% of its inhabitants are reported to have Polish ancestry. It is home to the Posen Potato Festival, held every year on during the first weekend after Labor Day. The festival includes activities with potato pancakes and polka dancing. Posen has a branch of the Presque Isle District Library. Posen is also the German name for the Polish city of Poznań.

Transportation

 North Eastern State Trail

Geography

Demographics

2010 census

As of the census of 2010, there were 234 people, 110 households, and 54 families living in the village. The racial makeup of the village was 96.2% White, 1.3% Native American, 0.4% Pacific Islander, and 2.1% from two or more races.

There were 110 households, of which 23.6% had children under the age of 18 living with them, 36.4% were married couples living together, 8.2% had a female householder with no husband present, 4.5% had a male householder with no wife present, and 50.9% were non-families. 42.7% of all households were made up of individuals, and 27.3% had someone living alone who was 65 years of age or older. The average household size was 2.07 and the average family size was 2.96.

The median age in the village was 46 years. 22.2% of residents were under the age of 18; 5.2% were between the ages of 18 and 24; 21.7% were from 25 to 44; 27.3% were from 45 to 64; and 23.5% were 65 years of age or older. The gender makeup of the village was 46.2% male and 53.8% female.

2000 census

As of the census of 2000, there were 292 people, 126 households, and 73 families living in the village. The racial makeup of the village was 94.18% White, 3.77% African American, and 2.05% from two or more races. Hispanic or Latino of any race were 0.34% of the population. 56.1% was of Polish, 15.3% German, 7.8% American, 3.1% French, 2.5% English, 1.6% French-Canadian, 1.2% Danish, 1.2% Irish, and 0.9% Russian ancestry.

There were 126 households, out of which 25.4% had children under the age of 18 living with them, 43.7% were married couples living together, 7.9% had a female householder with no husband present, and 41.3% were non-families. 36.5% of all households were made up of individuals, and 24.6% had someone living alone who was 65 years of age or older.  The average household size was 2.24 and the average family size was 2.92.

In the village, the population was spread out, with 23.6% under the age of 18, 8.9% from 18 to 24, 26.4% from 25 to 44, 16.1% from 45 to 64, and 25.0% who were 65 years of age or older.  The median age was 39 years. For every 100 females, there were 97.3 males.  For every 100 females age 18 and over, there were 85.8 males.

The median income for a household in the village was $27,969, and the median income for a family was $39,250. Males had a median income of $26,406 versus $24,250 for females. The per capita income for the village was $12,708.  About 8.9% of families and 19.3% of the population were below the poverty line, including 20.0% of those under the age of eighteen and 18.8% of those 65 or over.

References

Villages in Presque Isle County, Michigan
Villages in Michigan
Polish-American culture in Michigan